Artur Schneider (born 1 May 1993) is a German former professional footballer who played as a midfielder.

Career
Schneider came through 1. FC Saarbrücken's youth setup, and made his first-team debut in July 2012, when he replaced Markus Hayer in a 3. Liga match against VfL Osnabrück. After Saarbrücken were relegated at the end of the 2013–14 season, Schneider was released by the club and signed for SV Röchling Völklingen.

References

External links 
 

1993 births
Living people
German footballers
Association football midfielders
3. Liga players
1. FC Saarbrücken players
SV Röchling Völklingen players